Paradetis is a monotypic moth genus in the family Geometridae. Its only species, Paradetis porphyrias, also known as the orange and purple fern looper, is endemic to New Zealand. The genus and species were first described by Edward Meyrick, the genus in 1885 and the species in 1883.

Taxonomy
This species was first described by Meyrick in 1883 under the name Parysatis porphyrias. Meyrick went on to give a more detailed description of the species in 1884. In 1886 Meyrick renamed the genus of this species Paradetis. 

George Hudson illustrated and discussed this species under its current name Paradetis porphyrias in both of his books New Zealand Moths and Butterflies (Macro-lepidoptera) in 1898 and The Butterflies and Moths of New Zealand in 1928.

Description
The larva of this species is thin and green and when mature is 20 mm long.

Meyrick described the adult female of the species as follows:

Distribution
P. porphyrias is endemic to New Zealand. Meyrick first collected the species near Otira Gorge at Arthur's Pass in January. The species has also been found at Mount Arthur, Castle Hill, and Lake Wakatipu.

Habitat and host species

Alfred Philpott mentioned that the species frequented the banks of mountain streams. P. porphyrias larvae likely feed on Hypolepis millefolium.

References

Monotypic moth genera
Moths described in 1883
Geometridae
Moths of New Zealand
Endemic fauna of New Zealand
Taxa named by Edward Meyrick
Endemic moths of New Zealand